The Shark River Marl is a geologic formation in New Jersey. It preserves fossils dating back to the Paleogene period.

See also

 List of fossiliferous stratigraphic units in New Jersey
 Paleontology in New Jersey

References
 

Paleogene geology of New Jersey